Bart Korman is an American businessman and politician from the state of Missouri. A Republican, he is a former member of the Missouri House of Representatives, first elected from what was then Missouri's 99th District in November 2010, and re-elected each two years through 2016 from the 42nd District, unopposed except in 2014. Korman represented Montgomery County and adjacent portions of Warren and Saint Charles counties. He was term-limited in 2018 and Republican Jeff Porter was elected to succeed him. Korman works as a land surveyor and engineer, and is an auctioneer for his family's auction business.

Election results

References

1975 births
21st-century American politicians
Living people
Republican Party members of the Missouri House of Representatives
People from Hermann, Missouri
People from Montgomery County, Missouri
University of Missouri alumni